Mann's dwarf gecko (Lygodactylus manni) is a species of gecko, a lizard in the family Gekkonidae. The species is native to East Africa.

Etymology
The specific name, manni, is in honor of William Montana Mann, who was an American entomologist and zoo director.

Geographic range
L. manni is found in southwestern Kenya and northern Tanzania.

Habitat

Reproduction
L. manni is oviparous.

References

Further reading
Loveridge A (1928). "Description of a new species of gecko from Tanganyika territory, Africa". Proceedings of the United States National Museum 72 (24): 1-2 + Plate I). (Lygodactylus manni, new species).
Rösler H (2000). "Kommentierte Liste der rezent, subrezent und fossil bekannten Gekkotaxa (Reptilia: Gekkonomorpha)". Gekkota 2: 28–153. (Lygodactylus manni, p. 93). (in German).
Spawls, Stephen; Howell, Kim; Hinkel, Harald; Menegon, Michele (2018). Field Guide to East African Reptiles, Second Edition. London, New Delhi, New York, Sydney: Bloomsbury Natural History. 624 pp. . (Lygodactylus manni, p. 110).

Lygodactylus
Reptiles of Kenya
Reptiles of Tanzania
Reptiles described in 1928
Taxa named by Arthur Loveridge